Lo Wei ( 12 December 1918 – 20 January 1996) was a Hong Kong film director and film actor best known for launching the martial arts film careers of both Bruce Lee, in The Big Boss and Fist of Fury, and Jackie Chan, in New Fist of Fury.

Career 
Lo began his entertainment career as an actor in the Second World War. He moved to Hong Kong in 1948. During the 1950's Lo became a popular matinee idol.

After Lee's death it was Lo who gave Jackie Chan his first shot at the big time as part of the wave of Bruceploitation. Lo is said to have been linked with Chinese organized crime, the Triads.

Lo ran the production company "Lo Wei Motion Picture Company", which operated until 1977-78 due to heavy cost-cutting measures as a result of Jackie Chan signing a deal with Golden Harvest.

Lo is credited with over 135 films as an actor, over 60 films as a director, over 30 films as a writer, and over 45 films as a producer.

Filmography

Films 
This is a partial list of films.
 Chun lei (1949)
 Chun cheng hua luo (1949)
 Da liang shan en chou ji (1949)
 Hai shi (1949) - Ku San
 Wang Kui yu Gui Ying (1952) - Wang Kuei
 Wu shan meng (1953) - Mingde
 Nie hai qing tian (1953) - Song Siqing
 Ge nu Gong Lingyan (1953)
 Ming nu ren bie zhuan (1953)
 Xiao feng xian (1953)
 Dang fu qing chi (1953) - Wen Lung
 Yuan yang jie (1953)
 Mei gui mei gui wo ai ni (1954)
 Bi xue huang hua (1954)
 Yang e (1955)
 Xiao bai cai (1955)
 Xiao feng xian xu ji (1955)
 Jin sang zi (1955)
 Cha hua nu (1955)
 Ying du yan ji (1955)
 Ju zi gu niang (1955)
 Tao hua jiang (1956) - Li Ming
 Hong chen (1956) - Hong Dalong
 Xue li hong (1956)
 Lian zhi huo (1956)
 Jing hun ji (1956) - Ma Churen
 Mang lian (1956) - Lung Meng-tang
 Shui xian (1956) - Kuang Yung-Li
 Wo xin chang dan (1956)
 Hu die fu ren (1956) - Wu Chiao
 Xian mu dan (1956)
 Duo qing he (1957) - Ah-Ching
 Jiu se cai qi (1957)
 Ai yu zui (1957) - Zhang Long
 Chun guang wu xian hao (1957)
 Ankoru watto monogatari utsukushiki aishu (1957) - King of Cambodia
 Diao Chan (1958) - Tung Chuo
 Xiao qing ren (1958)
 Shan hu (1958) - Chang Da Shun
 Hai wang zi (1958)
 Xiang ru fei fei (1958)
 Jin feng huang (1958)
 Long xiang feng wu (1959)
 Man tang hong (1959)
 Sha ren de qing shu (1959)
 Gui wu ge sheng (1959) - Kuan Li-Chi
 Jia you xi shi (1959) - Feng Gengtang
 Tao wang 48 xiao shi (1959)
 Ye hua xiang (1959) - Shang Ching Cheng
 Er nu ying xiong chuan (1959)
 Kuer liulang ji (1960)
 Gong lou dian ying (1960)
 Tao hua lei (1960) - Hua Mingchun
 Zhi fen jian die wang (1960)
 Hei hu die (1960)
 Mi yue feng bo (1960) - Chang Ying-Wei
 Ti yu huang hou (1961) - Guo Sue's Father
 Yuan nu Meng Li Si (1961)
 Wu yu wen can tian (1961) - Ho Ji-Ching
 Zei mei ren (1961)
 Shou qiang (1961)
 Zao sheng gui zi (1962)
 Yi duan qing (1962)
 Jin jian meng (1963)
 Wu Ze Tian (1963)
 He hua (1963)
 Die hai si zhuang shi (1963)
 Bao lian deng (1964) - Prime Minister Qin
 Luan feng he ming (1964) - Juying's Father
 Shen gong yuan (1964) - Dorgan
 Sheng si guan tou (1964)
 E yu he (1965)
 Nu hai qing chou (1965) - Master Ting
 Qi qi gan si dui (1965)
 Jin pu sa (1966)
 1967 Angel With The Iron Fists - Chief Inspector. Also as director. 
 1967 Madame Slender Plum - Wang Xue Bin. Also as Director. 
 1967 Summons to Death - Gin Te-Biu. Also as screenwriter and director.
 1967 Cui ming fu 
 Jin shi qing (1968) - Liu Yi-Jen
 Nu xia hei hu die (1968) - Chief Gai Tian Lui
 Tie guan yin yong po bao zha dang (1968) - Professor Hsiung
 Duan hun gu (1968) - Chao Yun Yang
 Jurang bahaya (1968) - Mr. King
 Bayangan ajal (1968) - Mr. King
 Du long tan (1969)
 Hu dan (1969)
 Long men jin jian (1969) - Pai Chen-Tung
 Brothers Five (1970, Director)
 Gui tai jian (1971) - The King
 Ying zi shen bian (1971) - Chief Yang
 Gui liu xing (1971)
 The Big Boss (1971, Director)
  (1971, Director) - Shen Dun
 Jin Xuan Feng (1972)
 Fist of Fury (1972) - Inspector
 The Black Tavern (1972)
 1973 A Man Called Tiger - Director. Also as Nakatami / Moriyuki. 
 Ma lu xiao ying xiong (1973) - Tram passenger victim
 Hai yuan chi hao (1973) - Noodle shop boss
 Kung Fu Girl (1973, Director) - Commissioner Wu
 Yellow Faced Tiger (1974, Director)
 Naughty, Naughty (1974, Director)
 Chuo tou zhuang yuan (1974)
 Jin fen shen xian shou (1975)
 1976 Shaolin Wooden Men - Director, producer.
 1976 New Fist of Fury - Inspector (cameo). Also as Director, screenwriter, and producer.
 The Killer Meteors (1976, Director)
 Snake & Crane Arts of Shaolin (1977, Producer)
 To Kill with Intrigue (1977, Director)
 Spiritual Kung Fu (1978, Director)
 Dragon Fist (1979, Director)
 Fearless Hyena Part II (1983, Writer)
 Long hu zhi duo xing (1988)
 Haam ging bin yuen (1988)
 Shen xing tai bao (1989)
 Life Is Cheap... But Toilet Paper Is Expensive (1989) - The Boss
 Gong woo jui hau yat goh dai lo (1990) - (final film role)

Personal life 
On 20 January 1996, Lo died of heart failure in Hong Kong.

References

External links

 Lo Wei at fareastfilms.com

1918 births
1996 deaths
Film directors from Jiangsu
Hong Kong male film actors
Hong Kong film directors
Male actors from Jiangsu
20th-century Hong Kong male actors
Hong Kong screenwriters
Screenwriters from Jiangsu
20th-century screenwriters
Chinese emigrants to British Hong Kong